SM UB-27 was a German Type UB II submarine or U-boat in the German Imperial Navy during World War I. The U-boat was ordered on 30 April 1915 and launched on 10 February 1916. She was commissioned into the German Imperial Navy on 23 February 1916 as SM UB-27.

Design
A German Type UB II submarine, UB-27 had a displacement of  when at the surface and  while submerged. The submarine was powered by two Benz six-cylinder diesel engines producing a total , two Siemens-Schuckert electric motors producing , and one propeller shaft.

UB-26 was fitted with two  torpedo tubes, four torpedoes, and one  SK L/40 deck gun. She had a complement of twenty-one crew members and two officers and a thirty-second dive time.

Service history
The collier engaged the submarine and survived. Afterwards in Britain it was believed Wandle had sunk UB-27 and the master, G.E.A. Mastin, and his crew were celebrated.

UB-27 disappeared after 22 July 1917.  reported ramming and depth charging a U-boat on 29 July 1917.

Summary of raiding history

Notes

References

Bibliography 

 

1916 ships
Ships built in Bremen (state)
World War I submarines of Germany
German Type UB II submarines
U-boats commissioned in 1916
Maritime incidents in 1917
U-boats sunk in 1917
U-boats sunk by depth charges
U-boats sunk by British warships
World War I shipwrecks in the North Sea
Ships lost with all hands